Haurania is a genus of elongated, finely agglutinated benthic foraminifera included in the Spirocyclinidae. The test is free, starting with a brief planispiral coil followed by a straight uncoiled stage. The exterior is imperforate, the interior divided by radial septula or beams, perpendicular to the septa and outer wall. The aperture is cribrate, a series of openings on the terminal face.

This genus is known from the lower and middle Jurassic of China, Iraq and Morocco.

References 

 Alfred R. Loeblich, jr & Helen Tappan 1964. Sarcodina, Chiefly "Thecamoebians" and Foraminiferida. Treatise on Invertebrate Paleontology, Part C, Protista 2.  Geological Society of America and University of Kansas Press. 
 A.R. Loeblich & H Tappan, 1988,  in GSI.ir Paleontology,  
 Rotaliata, Textulariana  https://web.archive.org/web/20151222074257/http://www.foraminifera.eu/rotaliatatex.php

Loftusiida
Prehistoric Foraminifera genera
Early Jurassic genus first appearances
Middle Jurassic extinctions